Ogre is a 2008 American-Canadian television horror film directed by Steven R. Monroe for the Syfy Channel. In the story, teenagers stumble upon the fictional Ellensford, Pennsylvania a nearly forgotten town, stuck in a time loop in the mid 19th century. For the town to prevent a horrible plague from occurring, a human needs to be sacrificed every year to a vicious beast known as the Ogre.

Cast

 John Schneider as Henry Bartlett, one of the leaders of the village.
 Ryan Kennedy as Mike, one of the teens that go to the village.
 Katharine Isabelle as Jessica, one of the teens that go to the village.
 Brendan Fletcher as Stephen Chandler, a villager.
 Chelan Simmons as Hope Bartlett, daughter of Henry and Stephen's friend.

References

External links

2008 horror films
2008 television films
2008 films
2000s monster movies
2000s science fiction horror films
American independent films
American monster movies
American science fiction horror films
Canadian independent films
Canadian science fiction horror films
Canadian science fiction television films
CineTel Films films
English-language Canadian films
Films directed by Steven R. Monroe
Films scored by Pinar Toprak
Giant monster films
Canadian horror television films
Ogres in film
Syfy original films
Time loop films
2000s American films
2000s Canadian films